Jackie Lee Turner (June 29, 1930 – October 5, 2014) was an American basketball player for the New York Knicks in the National Basketball Association (NBA). He was drafted with the eighth pick in the first round of the 1954 NBA Draft by the Knicks. In his one NBA season, Turner averaged 4.3 points per game, 2.4 rebounds per game and 1.2 assists per game. He died at a hospital in Bedford, Indiana in 2014.

References

1930 births
2014 deaths
American men's basketball players
Basketball players from Indiana
New York Knicks players
New York Knicks draft picks
Shooting guards
Small forwards
Western Kentucky Hilltoppers basketball players